Memphis Central Station, referred to as Grand Central Station prior to 1944, is a passenger terminal in Memphis, Tennessee. Located along Main Street and G.E. Patterson Boulevard in Downtown Memphis, it currently a service stop for Amtrak's City of New Orleans route, arriving in late evening northbound and in the morning southbound. It is also served by the MATA Trolley system. The building was opened in 1914, and is located within the city's South Main Arts District. It is also an contributing property to the  South Main Street Historic District of the National Register of Historic Places, as are the National Civil Rights Museum and other historic properties within the district boundaries.

History

Early history 

Central Station was built on the site of a former station known as Calhoun Street Station.  Both stations were owned by the Illinois Central Railroad or its predecessors.  Construction of Memphis Central Station began in September 1912, and the station was opened for service on October 4, 1914.  The track design included five stub-end tracks (station tracks 1-5), and five through tracks (station tracks 6-10).

The station was also used by Yazoo and Mississippi Valley Railroad, St. Louis-San Francisco Railway, (also known as the Frisco) and Chicago, Rock Island and Pacific Railway (also known as Rock Island Railroad).  Between April 1, 1964, and November 30, 1966, the Louisville and Nashville Railroad was also a tenant, during the time that Memphis Union Station was closed.

Lavender v. Kurn, 327 U.S. 645 (1946) was a case decided by the Supreme Court of the United States dealing with a negligent wrongful death case brought by the estate of an Illinois Central employee, a switchtender at Broadway Crossing.  In December 1939, the switchtender had lined Frisco train #106 to back into Central Station.  After the train passed, the switchtender was found fatally injured, although the cause could not with certainty be determined to be accidental from being hit by a RPO mail hook or being murdered by a hobo in the area.  The relatives of the switchtender sued for negligence under the Federal Employers Liability Act and the Supreme Court upheld the claim.

Decline and renovation 
Like other large stations across America, the rapid decline of the passenger train network after World War II made Memphis Central Station an aging, nearly deserted monument to an earlier era. Rock Island passenger train service to Memphis ended in November 1967, and Frisco train service ended a month later, leaving Illinois Central as the sole occupant of the station. With the permanent closure of Union Station in 1968, Central Station became the sole intercity station in Memphis.

On May 1, 1971, Amtrak took over nearly all passenger trains in the United States. Amtrak cut back service to a single train, the City of New Orleans, and large sections of Central Station were closed off and abandoned.  Illinois Central offices were moved from the station, and it appeared that the station would eventually be razed, facing the same fate as Union Station.

The station's upkeep deteriorated to an extent that for much of time from the 1970s to the mid-1990s, it had a reputation as one of the worst stations on the Amtrak system. In 1998 the property was acquired by Memphis Area Transit Authority, which undertook a $23.2 million renovation project.  Much of the former waiting area would become a public meeting area, the Illinois Central office space on upper floors was converted to condominiums, and Amtrak retained a smaller presence in the former midway area of the station.  The station renovation, which was completed in November 1999, helped to speed the renovation and redevelopment of this once deserted area of downtown Memphis.

Role during Hurricane Gustav (2008) evacuations 
In anticipation of the landfall of Hurricane Gustav, the city of New Orleans began evacuating residents without the means to leave the city, starting on August 30, 2008.  One thousand twenty-four evacuees arrived in Memphis via Amtrak.

Today 

In 2019 the station underwent a major $55 million remodel that included a new Amtrak ticket office and waiting area. A new luxury hotel was opened in the station: Central Station Hotel, Curio by Hilton. The hotel includes a refurbished ballroom, two restaurants and a bar. The MATA Trolley Main Street Line heritage streetcar was extended to Central Station in 2021.

The station continues to be served by the City of New Orleans, which has called here since the train's inception in 1949. It previously served the train's nighttime counterpart, the famed Panama Limited.

Presently, this is one of only two Amtrak stations in Tennessee, the other being the Newbern Depot. It is the only Amtrak station in the state with full service; Newbern is a flag stop.

Named trains serving Memphis Central Station 
A partial list of named trains in the pre-Amtrak period that served Central Station:

Chicago, Rock Island and Pacific Railway (Rock Island)
Choctaw Rocket
Cherokee
Hot Springs Special
Memphis Californian
Southwest Express
Illinois Central Railroad
Panama Limited
City of New Orleans
Delta Express
Irvin S. Cobb
Louisiane
Northern Express/Southern Express
Louisville and Nashville Railroad (since 1964)
Pan-American
Southern Railway (since 1964)
Tennessean
St. Louis-San Francisco Railway (Frisco)
Memphian
Kansas City-Florida Special
Sunnyland
Yazoo and Mississippi Valley Railroad (in latter years, absorbed into Illinois Central)
Delta Express
Planter

See also 
Union Station (Memphis)

References

External links 

Condren, Mike.  "Memphis Central Station," Memphis Historical Railroad Pages
Parker, Tom.  "IC-Memphis Central Station," Illinois Central Net
Memphis Amtrak Station (USA Rail Guide -- Train Web)
Article from Railway Age Gazette (1915)

Amtrak stations in Tennessee
Memphis
Memphis
Memphis
Buildings and structures in Memphis, Tennessee
Railway stations in Tennessee
Memphis Area Transit Authority
Railway stations in the United States opened in 1914
Memphis